Lewis Trumbo (October 15, 1802 – February 14, 1869) was an American politician from Maryland. He served as sheriff of Carroll County, Maryland from 1845 to 1849 and served as a member of the Maryland House of Delegates in 1849.

Early life
Lewis Trumbo was born on October 15, 1802.

Career
Trumbo ran as a Whig for sheriff of Carroll County, Maryland, in 1842, losing to J. Henry Hoppe. Trumbo served as sheriff of Carroll County, Maryland, from 1845 to 1848. Trumbo served as a member of the Maryland House of Delegates, representing Carroll County, in 1849.

Personal life
Trumbo married Sarah. She died on February 18, 1870. His daughter Margaret Henrietta married state senator and comptroller Joshua W. Hering.

Trumbo died on February 14, 1869, at his home in Westminster, Maryland.

References

1802 births
1869 deaths
People from Westminster, Maryland
Maryland sheriffs
Members of the Maryland House of Delegates
Maryland Whigs